Sami Timimi is a British psychiatrist. He is a consultant in child and adolescent psychiatry, Director of medical education at Lincolnshire Partnership NHS Foundation Trust, and a visiting professor of child psychiatry at the University of Lincoln.

Background
Timimi grew up primarily in Iraq until the age of 14, then due to political difficulties moved to England; his mother is English and his father Iraqi. He has written of his experience of psychiatric training and early practice.

Career
Timimi is patron to the charity Carefree Kids and has authored several books including 'A Straight-Talking Introduction to Children's Mental Health Problems'. He gained an NHS England Regional Innovation Fund award for leading on an Outcome Orientated Child and Adolescent Mental Health Services (OO-CAMHS) project. He is a member of the Council for Evidence Based Psychiatry which focuses on adverse effects of medications in the long-term.

Timimi is skeptical of the benefits of psychiatric diagnosis, seen as primarily cultural constructions, and has critiqued the medicalisation of the various problems subsumed under the categories of ADHD and Autism (the latter co-authored with people with the diagnosis). He has described global mental health initiatives as a form of neo-liberalism. In his own practice he uses group psychotherapy focused on building relationships, using some techniques from The Nurtured Heart Approach.

In 2020, Timimi helped organise an open letter to Adrian James, the new President of the Royal College of Psychiatrists, calling on British psychiatry to do more to tackle racism.

Books

 Timimi S (2021) A straight Talking Introduction to Children's Mental Health Problems - Second Edition. Ross-on-Wye: PCCS Books.
 Timimi, S. (2020) Insane Medicine: How the Mental Health Industry Creates Damaging Treatment Traps and How you can Escape Them. KDP Publishing
 Runswick-Cole, K., Mallet, R., Timimi, S. (eds.) (2016) Re-thinking Autism: Diagnosis, Identity, and Equality. London: Jessica-Kingsley
 Timimi, S., Tetley, D., Burgoine, W. (2012) Outcome Orientated Child and Adolescent Mental Health Services (OO-CAMHS): A Service Transformation Toolkit. Author House UK.
 Timimi S, Gardiner N, McCabe, B. (2010) The Myth of Autism: Medicalising Men's and Boys' Social and Emotional Competence. Basingstoke: Palgrave MacMillan. 
 Timimi S (2009) A straight Talking Introduction to Children's Mental Health Problems. Ross-on-Wye: PCCS Books. 
 Timimi, S. and Leo, J. (eds.) (2009) Rethinking ADHD: From Brain to Culture. Basingstoke: Palgrave MacMillan. 
 Cohen, C. and Timimi, S. (eds.) (2008) Liberatory Psychiatry: Philosophy, Politics and Mental Health. Cambridge: Cambridge University Press.
 Timimi S and Maitra B (eds.) (2006) Critical Voices in Child and Adolescent Mental Health. London: Free Association. 
 Timimi, S. (2007) Mis-Understanding ADHD: The Complete Guide for Parents to Alternatives to Drugs. Bloomington: Authorhouse. 
 Timimi S (2005) Naughty Boys: Anti-Social Behaviour, ADHD and the Role of Culture. Basingstoke: Palgrave Macmillan. 
 Timimi S (2002) Pathological Child Psychiatry and the Medicalization of Childhood. Hove: Brunner-Routledge

References

Living people
British psychiatrists
Year of birth missing (living people)